The Critics' Choice Television Award for Best Supporting Actor in a Movie/Miniseries is one of the award categories presented annually by the Critics' Choice Television Awards (BTJA) to recognize the work done by television actors.

History
It was introduced in 2013. The winners are selected by a group of television critics that are part of the Broadcast Television Critics Association.

Winners and nominees

2010s

2020s

Multiple nominations

2 nominations
Murray Bartlett
Jesse Plemons
Finn Wittrock

See also
Golden Globe Award for Best Supporting Actor – Series, Miniseries or Television Film
Primetime Emmy Award for Outstanding Supporting Actor in a Limited Series or Movie

References

External links
 

Critics' Choice Television Awards
Television awards for Best Supporting Actor
Awards established in 2013